José Figueroa (born 21 October 1970) is a Puerto Rican judoka. He competed at the 1996 Summer Olympics and the 2000 Summer Olympics.

References

1970 births
Living people
Puerto Rican male judoka
Olympic judoka of Puerto Rico
Judoka at the 1996 Summer Olympics
Judoka at the 2000 Summer Olympics
Place of birth missing (living people)
20th-century Puerto Rican people